Keli Carender (born c. 1981) is an American blogger credited with being the first Tea Party protest activist when she was the principal organizer of a protest of the American Recovery and Reinvestment Act of 2009 on February 16, 2009. Carender started her blog Redistributing Knowledge on January 25, 2009, writing under the nom de plume Liberty Belle.

Biography 
Carender, a teacher of basic math for adults, founded and co-chaired The Seattle Sons & Daughters of Liberty. She is a graduate of the Western Washington University, and has a postgraduate Certificate of Education in Secondary Math from the University of Oxford.

References

External links 
 Redistributing Knowledge – Liberty Belle's blog
 

American women bloggers
American bloggers
American columnists
American political commentators
American political writers
Living people
Alumni of the University of Oxford
People from Seattle
Tea Party movement activists
1980s births
Western Washington University alumni
Schoolteachers from Washington (state)
American women educators
American women non-fiction writers
21st-century American non-fiction writers
American women columnists
21st-century American women writers